Yevheniya Serhiïvna Andrieieva (born 16 February 1976) is a Ukrainian rower. She competed in the women's coxless pair event at the 2000 Summer Olympics.

References

External links
 

1976 births
Living people
Ukrainian female rowers
Olympic rowers of Ukraine
Rowers at the 2000 Summer Olympics
Sportspeople from Dnipro